The Cosmopolitan Open was a golf tournament on the LPGA Tour from 1958 to 1965. It was played at the Macktown Golf Course in Rockton, Illinois.

Winners
Cosmopolitan Open
1965 Sandra Haynie

Cosmopolitan Women's Open
1964 Clifford Ann Creed
1963 Ruth Jessen

Cosmopolitan Open
1962 Sandra Haynie
1961 Betsy Rawls
1960 Betsy Rawls
1959 Kathy Cornelius

Macktown Open
1958 Mary Lena Faulk

References

Former LPGA Tour events
Golf in Illinois
Recurring sporting events established in 1958
Recurring events disestablished in 1965
1958 establishments in Illinois
1965 disestablishments in Illinois
History of women in Illinois
Winnebago County, Illinois